Mairi Angela Gougeon (née Evans; born 23 April 1985) is a Scottish politician who has served as Cabinet Secretary for Rural Affairs and Islands since 2021. A member of the Scottish National Party (SNP), she has been the Member of the Scottish Parliament (MSP) for Angus North and Mearns since 2016.

A graduate of the University of Aberdeen, Gougeon was elected to the Angus Council in the 2007 Scottish local elections. She represented the Brechin and Edzell ward and was the council's spokesperson on economic development. She stood down in the 2017 election, following her election to the Scottish Parliament the previous year.

In 2018, she was appointed Minister for Rural Affairs and the Natural Environment, before being appointed Minister for Public Health and Sport in 2020. Gougeon was re-elected in 2021 and was promoted to the Scottish Cabinet as Cabinet Secretary for Rural Affairs and Islands.

Early life

Education and early career 
Mairi Angela Evans was born on 23 April 1985 in Brechin in Angus. She was educated at Kilgraston School where she had a scholarship. She attended the University of Aberdeen from 2003 to 2007, graduating with a Master of Arts in history. From 2002 to 2010, she worked as Senior Assistant in the National Trust for Scotland.

Early political years 
After graduating from university, Gougeon was elected to Angus Council in the 2007 council election, representing the Brechin and Edzell ward. She became convener of infrastructure services, then later the development and enterprise convener.

Gougeon was re-elected in 2012 election. She was a member of Angus Council, who caused the eviction of 20 families from South Links Caravan Park, Montrose in 2015, following an inward investment decision in 2011, granting a third party an unsecured loan of £275,000.

Gougeon was chairwoman of the East of Scotland European Consortium. She did some political work in Brussels. She represented Convention of Scottish Local Authorities (COSLA) on the executive of the Council of European Municipalities and Regions (CEMR). She resigned as a councillor in 2017, following her election to the Scottish Parliament.

Member of the Scottish Parliament
In August 2015, Gougeon was selected to be the SNP candidate for the Angus North and Mearns constituency at the 2016 Scottish Parliament election, replacing the incumbent MSP Nigel Don. On 6 May 2016, she was elected to the Scottish Parliament and was sworn in on 13 May.

Junior minister 
She was appointed Minister for Rural Affairs and the Natural Environment in June 2018. In December 2020, she succeeded Joe FitzPatrick as Minister for Public Health and Sport after he had resigned due to an increase in drug deaths in Scotland.

Cabinet Secretary for Rural Affairs and Islands 
At the May 2021 Scottish Parliament election, Gougeon was re-elected as the MSP for Angus North and Mearns. On 19 May 2021, she was promoted to the Scottish Cabinet, as Cabinet Secretary for Rural Affairs and Islands in Nicola Sturgeon's new government.

Personal life

Gougeon married Paris-born Baptiste Gougeon in July 2017.

References

External links 
 
 profile on SNP website
 profile on Angus Council

1985 births
Living people
Alumni of the University of Aberdeen
Members of the Scottish Cabinet
Scottish National Party councillors
Scottish National Party MSPs
Members of the Scottish Parliament 2016–2021
Members of the Scottish Parliament 2021–2026
People from Angus, Scotland
Female members of the Scottish Parliament